Where Moth and Rust Destroy is the seventh studio album by the American Christian metal band Tourniquet. It was released on Metal Blade Records in 2003. The album's title is a reference to Matthew 6:19. Most of the guitar solos on this album were performed by former Megadeth guitarist Marty Friedman except for the tracks "A Ghost at the Wheel" and "Convoluted Absolutes", which were performed by Trouble guitarist Bruce Franklin.

Track listing

 appears on The Epic Tracks (2019)

Personnel

Tourniquet
Ted Kirkpatrick - drums, rhythm guitars, dulcimer, 8 string bazouki
Luke Easter - lead vocals
Steve Andino - bass

Guest musicians
Marty Friedman - lead guitar
Bruce Franklin - lead guitar
Dave Bullock - violin ("Architeuthis," "Drawn and Quartered," and "In Death We Rise")

Additional personnel
Mixed, produced, and recorded by Bill Metoyer for Skull Seven Productions
Co-produced by Ted Kirkpatrick
Photography: Jim Muth
Artwork: Brian J. Ames

References

External links
Where Moth and Rust Destroy at Tourniquet.net

Tourniquet (band) albums
2003 albums